Eloisa Compostizo de Andrés (born 8 August 1988) is a retired Spanish tennis player.

On 7 June 2010, she reached her highest WTA singles ranking of No. 199, while her best doubles ranking was 605 on 18 August 2008. In her career, she won three singles titles on the ITF Women's Circuit.

Compostizo de Andrés made her main-draw debut on the WTA Tour at the 2008 Barcelona KIA where she received a wildcard. There, after her first-round win against Émilie Loit, she lost to Nuria Llagostera Vives.

Compostizo de Andrés retired from professional tennis 2016.

ITF finals

Singles (3–3)

References

External links
 
 

1988 births
Living people
Spanish female tennis players